is a UK constitutional law case, concerning parliamentary sovereignty.

Facts
Pickin claimed that the British Railways Board fraudulently misled Parliament when it passed a private Act of 1968, which abolished a rule that if a railway line were abandoned, the land would vest in the owners of the adjoining land. This rule came from Private Acts of 1836 and 1845. Pickin had bought a small piece of land adjoining the railway line in 1969, the Clevedon-Yatton branch line in Somerset. When the railway closed, he claimed he was entitled to strip of the old line. He argued the Board did not comply with standing orders of each House of Parliament that required individual notice to be given to owners affected by private legislation.

Judgment

Court of Appeal
The Court of Appeal held there was a triable issue. Lord Denning MR said the following:

Edmund-Davies LJ and Stephenson LJ agreed.

House of Lords
The House of Lords held there was no power to disregard an Act of Parliament, public or private, or examine proceedings in Parliament to decide whether the Act was obtained by irregularity or fraud. It followed that Pickin could not claim that the British Railways Board had fraudulently misled Parliament, so as to vitiate an Act. This reversed the judgment of the Court of Appeal.

Lord Morris said the following.

See also

United Kingdom constitutional law

Notes

References

United Kingdom constitutional case law